Karchegan (also Romanized as Karchegan and Karchegan; also known as Garchegan and Karchegan) is a village in Cham Rud Rural District, Bagh-e Bahadoran District, Lenjan County, Isfahan Province, Iran. At the 2006 census, its population was 2,454, in 665 families.

References 

Populated places in Lenjan County